Aglaia tomentosa is a species of plant in the family Meliaceae. It is found in Australia (Queensland), Brunei, India, Indonesia, Laos, Malaysia, Papua New Guinea, the Philippines, Singapore, and Vietnam.

References

tomentosa
Sapindales of Australia
Flora of tropical Asia
Least concern flora of Australia
Flora of Queensland
Least concern biota of Queensland
Taxonomy articles created by Polbot